Mersin İdmanyurdu (also Mersin İdman Yurdu, Mersin İY, or MİY) Sports Club; located in Mersin, east Mediterranean coast of Turkey in 2003–04. The team participated in Second League Category A for 2nd time in the league's 3rd season. Mersin İdmanyurdu football team has finished 2003–04 season in 15th place in Second League Category A. Mersin idmanyurdu participated in 2003–04 Turkish Cup and eliminated at second round.

Macit Özcan was club president. MİY started to season with Yücel İldiz as the head coach. After 4th round Mehmet Şahan became the head coach. In the mid-season Levent Eriş took over the management of the team. Ufuk Talay was the most appeared player (33), while top goalscorer was Taner Demirbaş (15).

2003–04 TFF First League participation
In 2003–04 season Mersin idmanyurdu has participated in Second League Category A (the league has been played under the name of "Second League Category A" between 2001–02 and 2005–06; "TFF League A" in 2006–07; and "TFF First League" since 2007–08. Also sponsor names have been included in various seasons.). 18 teams attended in the league. Winners, runners-up and play-off winners were directly promoted to 2004–05 Süper Lig. Bottom three teams were relegated to 2003–04 TFF Second League.

Results summary
Mersin İdmanyurdu (MİY) 2003–04 Second League Category A season league summary:

Sources: 2003–04 Turkish Second Football League pages.

League table
Mersin İdmanyurdu (MİY) 2003–04 Second League Category A season place in league table.

Three points for a win. Rules for classification: 1) points; 2) tie-break; 3) goal difference; 4) number of goals scored. In the score columns first scores belong to MİY.
(C): Champions;  (P): Promoted to 2004–05 Süper Lig;  (R): Relegated to 2004–05 TFF Second League.
Source: 2003-04 TFF First League pages from TFF website, Turkish-Soccer website, and Maçkolik website.

Results by round
Results of games MİY played in 2003–04 Second League Category A by rounds:

First half
Mersin İdmanyurdu (MİY) 2003–04 Second League Category A season first half game reports is shown in the following table.
Kick off times are in EET and EEST.

Sources: 2003–04 TFF First League pages.

Second half
Mersin İdmanyurdu (MİY) 2003–04 Second League Category A season second half game reports is shown in the following table.
Kick off times are in EET and EEST.

In the half season, player Ahmet Arslaner (Elazığspor) left the team, Volkan Öztürk (Adanaspor) was transferred in.

Sources: 2003–04 TFF First League pages.

2003–04 Turkish Cup participation
2003–04 Turkish Cup was played for 42nd time as Fortis Türkiye Kupası for sponsorship purposes. This season Cup was played by 48 teams in one-leg elimination system in 3 elimination rounds prior to quarter-finals. Trabzonspor won the cup for the 7th time. Mersin İdmanyurdu participated in the cup and eliminated at first elimination round.

Cup track
The drawings and results Mersin İdmanyurdu (MİY) followed in 2003–04 Turkish Cup are shown in the following table.

Note: In the above table 'Score' shows For and Against goals whether the match played at home or not.

Game details
Mersin İdmanyurdu (MİY) 2003–04 Turkish Cup game reports is shown in the following table.
Kick off times are in EET and EEST.

Source: 2003–04 Turkish Cup pages.

Management

Club management
Macit Özcan, then mayor of Mersin city was president of the club.

Coaching team
Yücel İldiz was head coach at the start of the season. He took over the team in the mid of previous season. But, after 4th round he was replaced with Mehmet Şahan. In the mid-season Levent Eriş became the head coach. He coached the team until the end of the season.

2003–04 Mersin İdmanyurdu head coaches

Note: Only official games were included.

2003–04 squad
Appearances, goals and cards count for 2003–04 Second League Category A and 2003–04 Turkish Cup games. 18 players appeared in each game roster, three to be replaced. Only the players who appeared in game rosters were included and listed in order of appearance.

Sources: TFF club page and maçkolik team page.

See also
 Football in Turkey
 2003–04 TFF First League
 2003–04 Turkish Cup

Notes and references

2003-04
Turkish football clubs 2003–04 season